Per Gustaf ("Pelle") Seth (born 5 June 1946 in Stockholm) is a Swedish film director, cinematographer and screenwriter.

Selected filmography
1987 - Träff i helfigur (TV)
1997 - Beck – Mannen med ikonerna (director)
1997 - Beck – Lockpojken (director)
2006 - Göta kanal 2 – Kanalkampen (director)

References

External links

Male actors from Stockholm
1946 births
Living people
Swedish film directors
Swedish screenwriters
Swedish male screenwriters
Swedish cinematographers